Andreas Rogert (18 November 1754 – 10 June 1833) was a Norwegian jurist and politician.

Rogert was born in Trondhjem (now Trondheim), Norway, on 18 November 1754. He acquired a legal education in Copenhagen in 1779. He worked as a judge and assessor before he became Chief Justice during 1805. He maintained a residence at Collin-gården in Bispegata.

He represented the city of Trondhjem at the Norwegian Constituent Assembly in 1814, together with merchant Peter Schmidt. He was vice-president for meeting the first week, and was one of the fifteen who sat in the Constitutional Committee. He generally favored  (The Independence Party). He was not active in politics after the National Assembly.

He died in Trondheim on 10 June 1833.

References 

1754 births
1833 deaths
Fathers of the Constitution of Norway
Norwegian jurists
People from Trondheim